These are the Billboard magazine R&B singles chart number one hits of 1982:

Chart history

See also
1982 in music
R&B number-one hits of 1982 (USA)

1982